Hajdúbagos is a village in Hajdú-Bihar county, in the Northern Great Plain region of eastern Hungary.

History
The village was known as "Csirebagos" for a time in the Middle Ages, referring back to the gentry Csir family who held a number of villages in the vicinity between the 12th and 16th centuries.

Geography

Populated places in Hajdú-Bihar County